All-Star Baseball 99 is a video game developed by Iguana Entertainment and Realtime Associates Seattle Division and published by Acclaim Entertainment for the Game Boy and the Nintendo 64 in 1998. The game's cover features Colorado Rockies outfielder Larry Walker.

All-Star Baseball 99 was the first game to use Acclaim's Quagmire engine. The game also marked the debut of play-by-play commentary for the series. This is done by two New York Yankees broadcasters: John Sterling and Michael Kay.

Gameplay
The game contains exhibition, playoff, home run derby, and season modes. A "create-a-player" feature for customized ball players is included.

Reception

The Nintendo 64 version received favorable reviews, while the Game Boy version received average reviews, according to the review aggregation website GameRankings. Next Generation called the former "the best baseball game of the bunch for Nintendo 64. Minor AI problems and a slower pace keep it from becoming a classic, but it's definitely a big step in the right direction."

References

External links
 
 

1998 video games
Acclaim Entertainment games
All-Star Baseball video games
Baseball video games
Game Boy games
Nintendo 64 games
Video games developed in the United States